Stenidea hesperus is a species of beetle in the family Cerambycidae. It was described by Thomas Vernon Wollaston in 1863. It is known from the Canary Islands.

References

hesperus
Beetles described in 1863